Hackensack Meridian Health Mountainside, also known as Mountainside Hospital, is an acute-care hospital located in Montclair, New Jersey, United States. The hospital has 396 beds and serves Northeastern Essex County. A part of the Hackensack University Health Network, Mountainside Hospital is one of only two for-profit hospitals in New Jersey. It is also a clinical campus and affiliate of the New York Institute of Technology College of Osteopathic Medicine and provides clinical clerkship education for the medical school's osteopathic medical students.

About 
As of 2020, Mountainside Hospital provides 12 specialties and hosts 47 full-time interns and residents. It is designated a community perinatal center, intermediate, and a primary stroke center.

In 2021 it received from the American Heart Association and American Stroke Association a Gold Plus Quality Achievement Award and a Type 2 Diabetes Honor Roll Award. In fall, 2021, it received a C grade from Leapfrog Hospital Safety Program.

It owns and operates two centers for immediate injury and acute illness care, one in Bloomfield and the other Clifton.

History

In the summer of 1890, Margaret Jane Merewether Power of Montclair came upon a small child who had fallen from a third story window, and was in need of serious medical attention. Upset at the fact that there was no nearby health care facility, Mrs. Power called upon other ladies in her social circle, and vowed to work toward a solution to the problem. In 1891, a three-story building was purchased and prepared to care for patients. Dr. John J.H. Love was named the first President of the Medical and Surgical Staff of "The Mountainside Hospital". The word "The" was later dropped from the hospital's formal name, making it simply "Mountainside Hospital".

On May 31, 2007, it was purchased by Merit Health Systems, a privately owned for-profit Louisville, Kentucky hospital management company that acquires, owns and operates community hospitals. Merit continued to operate the hospital until February 1, 2012, when ownership of the hospital was transferred to Montclair Health System, LLC, a joint venture between LHP Hospital Group, Inc. (LHP) (now Ardent Health Services) and Hackensack Meridian Health, who together also operate Hackensack University Medical Center at Pascack Valley in Westwood, New Jersey.

In popular culture
On the American television drama series The Sopranos, A.J. Soprano is placed in the psychiatric ward at Mountainside Hospital after he tries to drown himself in the family pool. Later, his father Tony Soprano gets a bill of $2,200 per day for warehousing his son at the mental health facility.

People
 Kevin O'Connor, D.O., physician to President Joe Biden, completed his family medicine residency at Mountainside Medical Center and his doctorate medical education at the hospital's affiliated New York Institute of Technology College of Osteopathic Medicine.

References

External links
 Official website

Hospitals in Essex County, New Jersey
Hospitals in New Jersey
Buildings and structures in Essex County, New Jersey
Montclair, New Jersey